Walter Sell was an Austrian ice hockey player. He competed in the men's tournament at the 1928 Winter Olympics.

References

Year of birth missing
Year of death missing
Olympic ice hockey players of Austria
Ice hockey players at the 1928 Winter Olympics
Place of birth missing